Amplified is the debut studio album of American rapper Q-Tip, released November 30, 1999, on Arista Records. It became his first solo release after the disbandment of his former group A Tribe Called Quest in 1998. Production was primarily handled by Q-Tip and Jay Dee of The Ummah. The album spawned the Billboard Hot 100 hits "Vivrant Thing" and "Breathe and Stop".

The album debuted at number 28 on the Billboard 200, and on January 5, 2000, it was certified gold by the Recording Industry Association of America, for shipments of 500,000 copies in the United States. As of July 2008, Amplified has sold 675,000 copies in the US. It received generally positive reviews from music critics.

Background
Recorded after the dissolution of Q-Tip's former group, A Tribe Called Quest, Amplified marked a stylistic departure for Q-Tip; writer Kembrew McLeod noted, "fans of Tribe's rootsy aesthetic were caught off guard" by Q-Tip's "transformation from abstract poet to libidinous, brand-conscious baller." The album was primarily produced by Q-Tip and Jay Dee of The Ummah, who had previously collaborated for production on A Tribe Called Quest's Beats, Rhymes and Life and The Love Movement albums.

Music and lyrics
Building on the jazzy R&B sound of The Love Movement, many of Amplifieds beats were initiated by Jay Dee, with Q-Tip adding some final touches to it; "When we would work together, he would have it, like, 75 percent there and I would add a kick or bass line". Jon Pareles of The New York Times noted Q-Tip's lyrics as typified by boasts and playful seduction raps, however, on some tracks, he maintained the philosophical abstract lyricism that he was previously known for. The hip hop community criticized the album as a "glitzy, commercial reach."

Reception

Amplified debuted at number 28 on the Billboard 200, selling over 89,000 copies in its first week. On January 5, 2000, it was certified gold by the Recording Industry Association of America, for shipments of 500,000 copies in the United States. As of July 2008, Amplified has sold 675,000 copies in the US.

Amplified received generally positive reviews from music critics. AllMusic's John Bush hailed it as "an excellent work", with a production style that "emphasizes deep grooves and clipped beats with a polished sheen that takes Tribe's jazz-rap into the age of quiet storm and fusion." Bush also called Q-Tip's rapping "as smooth and inventive as ever." Colin Ross of PopMatters described it as "a vibe-orientated affair", noting that its "infectious hooks, Jay Dee's trademark keys, and some seriously funky beats all work to create a captivating soundscape upon which Q-Tip drops his traditionally abstract rhymes." The Village Voices Robert Christgau felt that the album's production suited Q-Tip better than that of A Tribe Called Quest albums, stating, "He gets stronger music out of hard beats than he ever did out of soft jazz." Soren Baker of the Los Angeles Times sensed "creative growth" from Q-Tip, praising the album as "an eclectic and enjoyable hip-hop experience." Writing for NME, John Mulvey initially believed that Amplified followed the mainstream "millennial hip-hop formula to the point of near anonymity", however, he concluded that it lived up to the high expectations of a Q-Tip album, calling the production a "brilliant hybrid of the organic and the modernist." Kris Ex of Rolling Stone summed it up as "stew-pot hip-hop – traditional blunts, broads and braggadocio filtered through Tip's abstract lens." Taylor M. Clark of Pitchfork felt that, lyrically, Q-Tip "regressed substantially", with rhymes that were "less crafty and more repetitive than any of his past works."

Christgau ranked Amplified number 12 on his "Dean's List" for The Village Voices Pazz & Jop critics' poll of 1999. In a retrospective review, Thomas Golianopoulos of Spin perceived that the album "aged quite well", further writing, "Though the tawdry booty videos for singles 'Breathe and Stop' and 'Vivrant Thing' bothered Tribe loyalists, 'Wait Up,' and 'Higher' maintain the group's ethos and hint at Tip's later unreleased work (Kamaal the Abstract and Open)." Kembrew McLeod, writing in The New Rolling Stone Album Guide, stated, "Although it may not have the staying power of Tribe's classics, Amplified is the ideal soundtrack for a carefree night at the club."

Track listing
All tracks produced by Jay Dee and Q-Tip, except tracks 9 and 11 produced by DJ Scratch.

Sample credits
Sampling information for Amplified adapted from The-Breaks.

"Higher" contains a sample from "Wonderin'" by Roy Haynes
"Breathe and Stop" contains samples from "By Myself" by Urszula Dudziak, "N.T." by Kool & the Gang and "Gypsy" by Emmett Chapman 
"Let's Ride" contains samples from "Giant Steps" by Joe Pass, "UFO" by ESG and "The Humpty Dump" by The Vibrettes
"All In" contains a sample from "Leo: Rosebud" by Cannonball Adderley 
"Go Hard" contains a sample from "M3000 (Opus VI)" by Mandre 
"Do It" contains a sample from "La Biguine Des Enfants Du Bon Dieu" by Kali
"Vivrant Thing" contains a sample from "I Wanna Stay" by Love Unlimited Orchestra

Personnel
Credits for Amplified adapted from liner notes.

 Chris Athens – mastering
 B+ – photography
 Lesvia Castro – production coordinator 
 DJ Scratch – producer 
 Drew Dixon – A&R
 Drew Fitzgerald – art direction
 Miriam Gonzales – production coordinator 
 Jason Groucott – engineer 
 Ken "Duro" Ifill – mixing, engineer 
 Jay Dee – producer 
 Micheline Levine – legal
 Chris Lighty – management 
 Glenn Marchese – mixing (track 10), engineer 
 Q-Tip – producer, mixing
 Mona Scott – management 
 Shaka – management 
 Steve Souder – engineer 
 Christopher Stern – art direction

Charts

Weekly charts

Year-end charts

Certifications

References

External links
 Amplified at Discogs
 Time: Hip-Hop's Next Wave — By Christopher John Farley

1999 debut albums
Albums produced by DJ Scratch
Albums produced by J Dilla
Albums produced by Q-Tip (musician)
Arista Records albums
Q-Tip (musician) albums